Catherine Jane Sutherland (born 24 October 1974) is an Australian actress. She is known for her portrayal of Kat Hillard, the second Pink Power Ranger and later, the Pink Zeo Ranger and the first Pink Turbo Ranger in the Power Rangers television series.

Sutherland also appeared in the 2000 film The Cell, which cut out her speaking part for the theatrical release.

Career
Sutherland joined the cast of Mighty Morphin Power Rangers partway through its third season, replacing Amy Jo Johnson's character Kimberly Hart as the bearer of the title of Pink Ranger. Sutherland as Kat remained a member of the cast during the fourth season Power Rangers Zeo, the film Turbo: A Power Rangers Movie, and the fifth season Power Rangers Turbo until she left the cast mid-season and was replaced by Patricia Ja Lee as Cassie Chan. Sutherland has said that Turbo was her favourite season to work on.

Sutherland also provided voice over work for some minor characters such as in the Power Rangers Wild Force episode "Forever Red". Sutherland has also appeared with other former cast members at fan conventions.

Sutherland also appeared in the 2000 film The Cell, which cut out her speaking part for the theatrical release. She had received the role after appearing on the Australian reality show Dream Factory. She also appeared in an advertising campaign for Rice Krispies cereal in the United States.

In 2017, she was cast in the short film The Order alongside many Power Rangers alumni.

In 2018, she returned to the role of Katherine Hillard for an episode of Power Rangers Super Ninja Steel entitled “Dimensions in Danger”, which celebrated the franchise’s 25th anniversary. Sutherland is due to return in a 30th-anniversary special set to be released on Netflix in 2023.

Filmography

Film

TV

Video game

References

External links

1974 births
20th-century Australian actresses
21st-century Australian actresses
Actresses from Sydney
Australian film actresses
Australian podcasters
Australian television actresses
Australian video game actresses
Australian voice actresses
Living people